Coleophora immersa is a moth of the family Coleophoridae. It is found in southern Russia.

The larvae feed on Kalidium foliatum. They feed on the generative organs of their host plant.

References

immersa
Moths described in 1989
Moths of Europe